The Time Tunnel is an American color science fiction TV series written around a theme of time travel adventure starring James Darren and Robert Colbert. The show was creator-producer Irwin Allen's third science-fiction television series and was released by 20th Century Fox Television and broadcast on ABC. The show ran for one season of 30 episodes from 1966 to 1967. A pilot for a new series was produced in 2002 but did not proceed to a series. A history of the series by Martin Grams, Jr., was published in 2012.

Premise
Project Tic-Toc is a top-secret U.S. government effort to build an experimental time machine, known as "The Time Tunnel" due to its appearance as an elliptical passageway. The base for Project Tic-Toc is a huge, hidden underground complex in Arizona, 800 floors deep and employing more than 12,000 specialized personnel. The directors of the project are Dr. Douglas Phillips (Robert Colbert), Dr. Anthony Newman (James Darren), and Lt. General Heywood Kirk (Whit Bissell). The specialists assisting them are Dr. Raymond Swain (John Zaremba), a foremost expert in electronics, and Dr. Ann MacGregor (Lee Meriwether), an electrobiologist supervising the unit that determines how much force and heat a time traveler is able to withstand. The series is set in 1968, two years into the future from the actual broadcast season, 1966-67.

Project Tic-Toc is in its 10th year when United States Senator Leroy Clark (Gary Merrill) comes to investigate to determine whether the project, which has cost $7.5 billion (equivalent to $ billion in ), is worth continuing. Senator Clark feels the project is a waste of government funds. When speaking to Phillips, Kirk, and Newman in front of the Time Tunnel, he delivers an ultimatum - either they send someone into time and return him during the course of his visit or their funding will cease. Tony volunteers for this endeavor, but he is turned down by project director Doug Phillips. Defying this decision, Tony sends himself into time. Doug follows shortly after to rescue him, but they both continue to be lost in time. Senator Clark returns to Washington with the promise that funding will not be cut off to the project, leaving General Kirk in charge.

The stage is set for the progress of the series as Tony and Doug are now "switched" from one period in history to another, allowing episodes to be set in the past and future. Episodes 2 - 23 begin with the following narration (voiced by Dick Tufeld):

Tony and Doug become participants in past events such as the sinking of the Titanic, the attack on Pearl Harbor, the eruption of Krakatoa, Custer's Last Stand, and the Battle of the Alamo, among others. General Kirk, Ray, and Ann in the control room are able to locate them in time and space, observe them, occasionally communicate with them through voice contact, and send help. When the series was abruptly cancelled in the summer of 1967 by ABC, they had not filmed an episode in which Tony and Doug are safely returned to the Time Tunnel complex.

Possibility of time travel

According to the plot, time travel is facilitated by time being portrayed as a static continuum, accessible at any point through the Time Tunnel as a corridor spanning its infinite reaches. When Senator Clark sees an image of the Titanic on the image screen in the course of episode one, he is told by Dr. Swain that he is seeing "the living past", and Althea Hall is told by Tony Newman that the past and the future are the same. The Time Tunnel is also a portal connecting the Time Tunnel "complex" with the same time periods in which Doug and Tony are located. Other people can also be relocated by the Time Tunnel from their time to another time as Machiavelli is switched from his own time to the time of the Gettysburg Campaign of 1863. Bringing people (other than Tony and Doug) to the present happens often in the series, but the only occasion in which Tony and Doug return to their own time occurs in "Merlin the Magician", when the great wizard uses magic to bring them home in suspended animation so he can instruct them to perform a mission for him.

In the course of the series, Doug, Tony, and the Time Tunnel personnel discover that events of the past can be altered to some extent by the intrusion of the time travelers, and in a few cases, their historical research allows for it. Episode 26 ("Attack of the Barbarians") explores the scenario of one of the time travelers falling in love with someone from the past: Tony and the Princess Serit, daughter of Kublai Khan. Marco Polo tells Doug, "Can they not touch each other?" History itself hints at the possibility of Serit marrying Tony as Ann informs General Kirk. The historical information on Billy the Kid's victims alarms Ann, Ray, and the General, as it records that he killed two strangers near Lincoln, New Mexico, in April 1881—just when Tony, Doug, and Billy the Kid are brought together.

Production
The production used sets, stock footage, and props left over from the large number of period dramas made by the 20th Century Fox film company. Even black-and-white shots purporting to show the Titanic sinking were tinted for use in this color production. Only a few actors were costumed for a given episode, interspersed with cuts of great masses of people similarly dressed from original features. Only one set was constructed for the show, that of the Time Tunnel main control room. For the pilot episode, a large control room set was built, and a longer Time Tunnel was created using optical matte shots. After the pilot episode, location changes occurred for the production of the series; Colbert and Darren shot their scenes in another studio, on the 20th Century Fox backlot, or on location, while those who portrayed the Time Tunnel personnel filmed all their scenes on a revised and smaller Time Tunnel control room set (due to the production having to use a smaller sound stage than used during the pilot filming). Some episodes featured space aliens who wore costumes and carried props originally created for other Irwin Allen television and film productions. Prop sets were similarly reused. The prop computer, however, had an unusual degree of verisimilitude because it was an array of memory modules from the Air Force's recently decommissioned SAGE computer.

Continuity errors and errors in historical fact occurred in the series. In the premiere episode, "Rendezvous with Yesterday", Captain Smith of the Titanic is called "Malcolm", when historically, his name was "Edward". The names of the secondary officers are also fictitious, though Walter Lord's best-selling nonfiction book about the event, A Night to Remember, had been released nine years earlier. Tony states that he was born in 1938. A few episodes later in "The Day the Sky Fell in", he states he was seven when Pearl Harbor was attacked on 7 December 1941, which would make the year of his birth 1934, or possibly 1933, if later than 7 December.

The theme tune for The Time Tunnel was composed by John Williams (credited, as in Lost in Space, as "Johnny Williams"). GNP Crescendo later released an album featuring Williams' work and the score composed by George Duning for the episode "The Death Merchant".

The series won an Emmy Award in 1967, for Individual Achievements in Cinematography. The award went to L.B. "Bill" Abbott, for his photographic special effects.

Recurring elements
 A short "teaser" from next week's episode was shown at the end of each episode as Doug and Tony arrived at their next destination, with one exception: Episode three's ending teaser has a scene where Tony lands 10 years before 1968 in the desert, at the time tunnel complex. He tries to tell Doug that he works there and he knows him. This was not to be seen in the following episode.
 The impressive introduction to the scale of the project (over 36,000 people and huge underground buildings) is never seen after the first episode except for two clips of the giant power generator flashing, and Tunnel Security running across a walkway. New matte paintings and models were created specifically for The Time Tunnel pilot episode.
 Most episodes involved the capture or detention of Doug, Tony, or both, their escape, their recapture, and their escape again, before their move to the next episode.
 Nearly all location shooting was filmed in and around Southern California. This causes scenes set in different parts of the country (or the world) to have the same general hilly landscape with arid-type trees and brush typical to the local region where filming occurred.
 The majority of episodes placed Tony and Doug in stories set in past historical contexts.
 Aliens and people from the future were similarly dressed, often in metallic silver clothing, like other Irwin Allen television series of the same era.
 Many episodes used stock footage from previous 20th Century-Fox and Irwin Allen productions. These shots ran the gamut from episodes on General Custer, to the sinking of the Titanic, and many other historical events.

Episodes
While the episodes were first shown in 1966, the show's setting begins in 1968, two years into the then-future.

Cancellation
Although The Time Tunnel was scheduled on Fridays (often considered the "Friday night death slot" for TV programs), the ratings for the series were solid. ABC pointed to The Time Tunnel as one of the few successes in a disastrous schedule.

A series titled The Legend of Custer was lobbied to drop The Time Tunnel in favor of Custer.  The network headquarters gave green light for Custer, and The Time Tunnel was cancelled.

The Legend of Custer was itself cancelled after airing 17 low-rated episodes, skewered by critics and performed worse than The Time Tunnel.

Media

Novels

Murray Leinster promotional novel
In January 1967 a promotional novel, The Time Tunnel, was published by Pyramid Books. The author was Murray Leinster, who had previously written a novel of the same name in 1964, completely unrelated to the television series. Leinster used four of the main characters: Tony Newman, Doug Phillips, General Kirk, and Ann MacGregor as well as the initial antagonist Senator Clark. Unlike the television series, Project Tic-Toc is secretly begun and financed through the Defense Department without the consent of Congress. General Kirk is a retired Air Force General rather than an active duty Army General. Senator Clark, rather than urging immediate human time travel as he does in the TV series, demands that Project Tic-Toc refrain from going forward with it. He does this in the interests of humanity, which, in his view, would be adversely affected by a person from the future intruding into the past: ancestors of persons now living could be killed by a time traveler resulting in their descendants now living ceasing to exist or inventions and developments of the past being changed resulting in the wiping out of what exists in the present day.

Tony and Doug's relocation to Johnstown, Pennsylvania just before the Johnstown Flood of May 31, 1889 allows them the opportunity of saving the life of Senator Clark's grandmother, Julie Bowen. If Tony and Doug had not gone back in time and saved her, Senator Clark would have ceased to exist.

The second time and place Tony and Doug are relocated to is the Texas prairie near Adobe Walls, Texas, June 26, 1874. They are picked up by a traveling group of hunters tracking bison at the scene of the massacre of another group of bison hunters by Comanche warriors. Tony and Doug travel with them to Adobe Walls just in time for the historic battle on June 27. Knowing about the impending attack and the incident of the cracking of the ridgepole of the sod roof of Hanrahan's saloon where Tony and Doug were staying, they caused the cracking themselves by shooting at the pole. This effectively awakened the sleeping hunters, making them ready to repulse the attack of the Native American warriors. Tony and Doug were able to assist the historic Bat Masterson in his exploits in the battle.

Tony and Doug's final adventure before being returned to the Time Tunnel took them to Saint Louis, Missouri sometime in the distant future. The American populace is menaced by aliens setting up a force field. Tony and Doug were able to utilize a vehicle capable of moving in both time and space developed by the Time Tunnel while they were in Adobe Walls. It is a floating platform with rails operated by Ann MacGregor back in the Time Tunnel control room. They appear to anyone seeing them as people riding on a flying carpet. In the Saint Louis library Doug finds out that he will marry Ann MacGregor, who is in love with him, and they will have three children. With the help of the "time traveler" platform they are able to destroy the flimsy alien craft and return to the Time Tunnel complex.

Other novelizations
This was followed later in the year by Timeslip: Time Tunnel Adventure #2, the last novel based on the TV series, written again by Murray Leinster. The front and back covers feature photos from the series.

In Timeslip, an experimental nuclear missile was sent through the Time Tunnel - but something went wrong, and it wound up at the bottom of a pond within Mexico City, in the 1840s. In the present (1968), excavation equipment was moving toward the site - any day a bulldozer blade might set it off, destroying a mighty city and plunging the world into war. Time travelers Tony Newman and Doug Phillips had only one chance to head off disaster - to go through the Time Tunnel and make the accident "unhappen." The trouble was, there was a war on in the past - and the bomb was in enemy territory.

Comic books
There were two issues put out by Gold Key Comics (Western Publishing Co.) in 1966-1967. These were reprinted by Hermes Press in 2012.

In Issue #1:
 The Time Tunnel: The Assassins - April 14, 1865, Abe gets a second chance.
 The Lion or the Volcano? - August 24, 79 A.D., Pompeii. It's the lions or Vesuvius for Doug & Tony — which will it be?
 Mars Count-Down - 1980. Will the US make it to Mars? Will Doug & Tony make it back to Earth?
In Issue #2:
 The Time Tunnel: The Conquerors - D-Day 1944. The Nazis get a second chance—this time with weapons from the future.
 The Captives - June 25, 1876, mid-America. Custer gets a second chance.

DVD releases
20th Century Fox Home Entertainment released the entire series on DVD in Region 1 in 2006 in two volumes. Volume Two includes the unaired 2002 pilot and the made-for-TV film The Time Travelers as special features. The DVD box sets include nearly all full-length, uncut and unedited original network prints, but one episode, "Chase Through Time", was edited.

In Region 2, Revelation Films released the entire series on DVD in the UK in one complete series box set.

In Region 4, Madman Entertainment released the complete series on DVD in Australia on August 20, 2014.

Blu-ray releases 
In Region B, Revelation Films has released the entire series on Blu-ray in the UK in one set. Though made for the UK, the Blu-ray set is in fact all-region and plays in US players.

Record album
The Time Tunnel 1967 ABC-TV Japanese book with record album. 33⅓ RPM record licensed and manufactured for exclusive release in Japan by Asahi Sonorama company and was released during the show's original airing in 1967. The record is pressed in blue-vinyl and contains the time-travel drama "Adventure in the Lost World." The highlight of this package is the colorful 12-page booklet which showcases original storybook artwork of the record's episode with the intrepid time travelers being terrorized by rampaging dinosaurs and angry cavemen.

Soundtrack album

An album of music from the series, featuring the episodes "Rendezvous With Yesterday" (tracks 2-4) and "The Death Merchant" (tracks 5 and 6) was released by GNP Crescendo as part of the collection The Fantasy Worlds of Irwin Allen.

 The Time Tunnel: Main Title - John Williams (:39)
 To The Tunnel/Tony Enters Machine/Tony's First Trip/Titanic Trot/The Titanic - John Williams (10:06)
 Tony's Tall Tales/Althea's Attack/Doug's Arrival/Hose Nose/Telegraph/Approaching The Berg - John Williams (7:11)
 The Iceberg Cometh/Time Transfer/The Jungle - John Williams (10:24)
 In The Battle/Lost Trail/Anne Worried/Michael's Dog/No Sign/Omens/Corporal Shot/The Trunk - George Duning (7:16)
 Doug Duels/Tony Returns/Doug Chased/Tony Again/Pal Fight/More Pal Fight/What's Happened/Stand Back - George Duning (7:35)
 The Time Tunnel: End Title - John Williams (:50)

Episodes with original music
Listed in production order.
 "Rendezvous with Yesterday" (John Williams)
 "End of the World" (Lyn Murray)
 "One Way to the Moon" (Lyn Murray)
 "Revenge of the Gods" (Leith Stevens)
 "Secret Weapon" (Paul Sawtell)
 "The Day the Sky Fell In" (Paul Sawtell)
 "The Last Patrol" (Lyn Murray)
 "Crack of Doom" (Robert Drasnin)
 "Massacre" (Joseph Mullendore)
 "Reign of Terror" (Leith Stevens)
 "The Death Trap" (Robert Drasnin)
 "The Death Merchant" (George Duning)

Games
The Time Tunnel 1966 boxed board game from Ideal Toys (No. 2326-7). The playing board design shows characters and events from the prehistoric era into the future. The box insert has a spinner board and other parts include playing cards, tokens, and marker disks. The second game is The Time Tunnel: Spin-To-Win, a 1967 boxed board game from Pressman Toys, which features a box insert playing board that has a tunnel-like design representing different past years in history and plastic tops are spun on the playing board to determine "Time Travels."

Pinball games - Bally Manufacturing created a pinball called Time Tunnel in 1971 based loosely on the TV series, but production was stopped due to copyright infringement. The game was re-released with revised artwork as Space Time.

Other
 The Time Tunnel coloring book
 The Time Tunnel Viewmaster set - Saalfield #9561, 1966A story book to color, 80 pages, Sawyer #B491, 1966. Three Viewmaster slides from "Rendezvous With Yesterday" and 16-page story booklet that tells the pilot episode.
 The Time Tunnel comic book, 2 issues published by Western Publishing, February 1967 - July 1967.

After the original run
In 1982, five feature-length television films were assembled from 10 complete individual episodes with portions of the first episode as introductory material. Aliens from Another Planet, was produced using episodes 24 ("Chase Through Time") and 18 ("Visitors from Beyond the Stars"). Revenge of the Gods was a compilation of episodes 7 ("Revenge of the Gods") and 20 ("The Walls of Jericho). Old Legends Never Die edited together episodes 27 ("Merlin the Magician") and 16 ("The Revenge of Robin Hood"). Kill or Be Killed comprised episodes 4 ("The Day the Sky Fell In") and 17 ("Kill Two by Two"). Raiders from Outer Space was compiled from episodes 28 ("The Kidnappers") and 2 ("One Way to the Moon").

Remakes
To date, three attempts have been made to resurrect the show. Two produced a pilot episode, and another got no further than a script.

1976 remake

2002 remake
In 2002, Fox showed interest in remaking this series. A pilot was produced by Twentieth Century Fox Television, Fox Television Studios, and Regency Television in association with Irwin Allen Properties. Kevin Burns and Jon Jashni were executive producers. Sheila Allen was credited as one of the producers. The series was not ordered by Fox so as to make room in its schedule for Joss Whedon's Firefly.

The pilot had a darker and more serious tone than the original 1966 series. Doug Phillips (David Conrad) is the main character, and Tony Newman's character was replaced by Toni Newman, a minor female character. The unaired pilot episode is available on DVD from Fox Home Entertainment on The Time Tunnel: Volume Two, Disc Four.

In this remake, the 2002 Time Tunnel is a Department of Energy research project into nuclear fusion, which produces nearly limitless energy. When the reactor was initiated (not shown in the episode), that caused an unintended "time storm" which uncontrollably changed history. The DOE was able to anchor one end of the storm by using the Tunnel like a lightning rod.

On their way into the tunnel complex, Flynn tells Doug Phillips, a former friend, that the latter has been recruited because he has a detailed knowledge of the Battle of Hürtgen Forest. The head of the Time Tunnel project likens their team to FEMA—they don't send a team back for a rain storm but they do for hurricanes. However, they can only go through time to where the other end of the storm is at the current moment, so they have a limited period to fix what is wrong and to be retrieved by the Time Tunnel.

The team (Doug, Toni, Flynn, J.D., and Wix) must travel to the Battle of Hürtgen Forest in 1944 Germany during World War II. They plan to retrieve a person moved there by the time storm from 1546. During the mission, Doug Phillips meets his grandfather, a soldier who will be killed in the battle. Doug knows this, but cannot tell his ancestor and save his life because it would change history. Toni Newman tells Doug she used to have three brothers and two sisters before the time storm accident but is now an only child. The time travelers learn the displaced person is a now-confused medieval monk who carries bubonic plague. When the team is almost captured, two members switch to German uniforms and pretend to be Colonel Klink and (Sergeant) Schultz, complete with fake documents. Everyone who came in contact with the monk is given an antibiotic injection and the time ripples stop. But Flynn has been fatally stabbed, so he reveals Phillips was a bitter man before the time storm, but he now has a family. Flynn tells Phillips this information to give him an incentive to keep the timeline intact.

Reality changes due to the time storm
There are some notable differences between the series world and the real world:
Traffic lights use red for "go" and green for "stop" while yellow retains its meaning.
There are 49 states in the United States. The title sequence shows New Jersey disappearing and the territory being divided between New York and Pennsylvania.
The title sequence shows the Soviet Union winning the race to the moon as the American flag dissolves into the Soviet flag.
The New York Yankees are now the Boston Yankees.

2006 remake
The SciFi Channel announced in 2005 it would create a new pilot for its 2006/07 season. Allen's wife, Sheila, and two producers of the 2002 FOX remake (Kevin Burns and Jon Jashni) began work on the new pilot. John Turman (Hulk) wrote the script. The series never went beyond a pilot script.

Parodies
A recurring sketch called Drunk In Time starred Alexei Sayle and Peter Capaldi as two men so inebriated that they weren't aware they were time travellers. Featuring a mock up of the original Project Tic-Toc set and animated Time Tunnel-style title sequence, the main characters are also called Doug and Tony. The six sketches featured in The All New Alexei Sayle Show in 1995.

See also
 List of time travel science fiction
 The Time Machine
 Time travel in fiction

References

External links
 
 
 The 1964 book by Leinster at isfdb.org

1960s American science fiction television series
1960s American time travel television series
1966 American television series debuts
1967 American television series endings
American Broadcasting Company original programming
Cultural depictions of Benito Mussolini
English-language television shows
Fictional depictions of Abraham Lincoln in television
Jiro Kuwata

Television series by 20th Century Fox Television
Television series by Irwin Allen Television Productions
Time travel devices
Television series set in 1968
Television shows set in Arizona
Television series created by Irwin Allen
Television series about being lost from home